The Gardelegen  massacre was a massacre perpetrated by the local population (Volkssturm, Hitlerjugend and local firefighters) of the northern German town of Gardelegen, with minor direction from the SS, near the end of World War II. On April 13, 1945, on the Isenschnibbe estate near the town, the troops forced over 1,000 slave laborers who were part of a transport train evacuated from the Mittelbau-Dora and Hannover-Stöcken concentration camps into a large barn, which was then set on fire — an atrocity that closely resembled that which had occurred at the Great Synagogue in Białystok, Poland four years earlier.

One thousand and sixteen prisoners, of whom the largest number were Poles, were burned alive or shot trying to escape. The crime was discovered two days later by Company F, 2nd Battalion, 405th Infantry Regiment, U.S. 102nd Infantry Division, when the U.S. Army occupied the area. Eleven prisoners were found alive – seven Poles, three Russians and a Frenchman. The testimonies of survivors were collected and published by Melchior Wańkowicz in 1969, in the book From Stołpców to Cairo. Gardelegen became a part of the newly established German Democratic Republic in 1947 and is now in Saxony-Anhalt, Germany.

Details

The discovery of the massacre seems to have been by chance.  The consensus account is that American Lieutenant Emerson Hunt, a liaison officer between 102nd Infantry Division headquarters and the 701st Tank Battalion, was captured by German forces on April 14, 1945, and bluffed the German forces defending the town of Gardelegen into believing that American tanks were approaching the city. This induced the German commander to surrender to the American forces.  The Americans arrived at the site before the Germans had time to bury all of the bodies.

On April 3–4, following the U.S. Army's crossing of the Rhine River and push into Germany, the SS camp administration at Dora-Mittelbau had ordered the evacuation of prisoners from the main camp and a number of its affiliated subcamps. The goal was to transport the inmates by train or by foot to the other north German concentration camps: Bergen-Belsen, Sachsenhausen, or Neuengamme.

Within days, some 4,000 prisoners from Mittelbau-Dora, its satellite camps, and from the Neuengamme subcamp Hannover-Stöcken arrived in the Gardelegen area, where they had to deboard from the freight cars because the trains could not advance any further due to air raid damage to the rail lines. Greatly outnumbered by the prisoners, the SS guards began recruiting auxiliary forces from the local fire department, the air force, the aged home guard, the Hitler Youth, and other organizations to watch over the inmates.

On April 13, more than a thousand prisoners, many of them sick and too weak to march any further, were taken from the town of Gardelegen to a large barn on the Isenschnibbe estate and forced inside the building. The assembled guards then barricaded the doors and set fire to gasoline-soaked straw. Prisoners who escaped the conflagration by digging under the barn's walls were killed by the guards. The next day, the SS and local auxiliaries returned to dispose of the evidence of their crime. They planned to incinerate what remained of the bodies and the barn, and kill any survivors of the blaze. The swift advance of the 102nd Infantry Division, however, prevented the SS and its accomplices from completely carrying out this plan.

On April 14, the 102nd entered Gardelegen and, the following day, discovered the atrocity. They found the corpses of 1,016 prisoners in the still-smoldering barn and nearby trenches, where the SS had the charred remains dumped. They also interviewed several of the prisoners who had managed to escape the fire and the shootings. U.S. Army Signal Corps photographers soon arrived to document the Nazi crime and by April 19, 1945, the story of the Gardelegen massacre began appearing in the Western press. On that day, both the New York Times and The Washington Post ran stories on the massacre, quoting one American soldier who stated:
I never was so sure before of exactly what I was fighting for. Before this you would have said those stories were propaganda, but now you know they weren't. There are the bodies and all those guys are dead.

Eleven prisoners survived the burning of the barn and were found alive by U.S. soldiers – seven Poles, three Russians and one severely wounded Frenchman. According to eyewitnesses, 20 men who participated in the massacre were immediately summarily executed by U.S. soldiers after being identified.

On April 21, 1945, the local commander of the 102nd ordered between 200 and 300 men from the town of Gardelegen to give the murdered prisoners a proper burial. Over the next few days, the German civilians exhumed 586 bodies from the trenches and recovered 430 bodies from the barn, placing each in an individual grave. On April 25, the 102nd carried out a ceremony to honor the dead and erected a memorial tablet to the victims, which stated that the townspeople of Gardelegen are charged with the responsibility that the “graves are forever kept as green as the memory of these unfortunates will be kept in the hearts of freedom-loving men everywhere.” Also on April 25, Colonel George Lynch addressed German civilians at Gardelegen with the following statement:

The German people have been told that stories of German atrocities were Allied propaganda. Here, you can see for yourself. Some will say that the Nazis were responsible for this crime. Others will point to the Gestapo. The responsibility rests with neither — it is the responsibility of the German people....Your so-called Master Race has demonstrated that it is master only of crime, cruelty and sadism. You have lost the respect of the civilized world.

Investigation

An investigation was undertaken by Lieutenant Colonel Edward E. Cruise, Investigating Officer, Ninth Army War Crimes Branch.

Text of Lieutenant Colonel Cruise's report and text of other exhibits are stored in US Army file 000-12-242.

SS-Untersturmführer , the transport leader for the prisoners evacuated from the Mittelbau-Dora concentration camp who subsequently wound up in Gardelegen, was put on trial in 1947 before a US military tribunal and was convicted and sentenced to life in prison. He died of leukemia in 1950.

Statements of the survivors were gathered by Polish writer Melchior Wańkowicz and published in 1969.

Memorials

Gardelegen is now a national memorial, which was rearranged by East Germany from 1952 till 1971.

The sign at the cemetery, founded by the U.S. Army, reads:

The sign at the remaining wall of the barn, applied by officials of the German Democratic Republic, reads:

Memorial barn Isenschnibbe Gardelegen
The memorial is located at the historic scene of the massacre of Gardelegen. It is a reminder of the 1016 concentration camp prisoners from many European countries who were murdered there on 13 April 1945 in a field barn near the Hanseatic city of Gardelegen. The site also includes the Memorial Cemetery, where the victims of the massacre are buried.

A new visitor/documentation centre with a permanent exhibition opened in 2020.

References

 A Soldier's Story on Nazi Evil, Effingham Daily News, May 1, 1999
 Daniel Blatman: Die Todesmärsche 1944/45. Das letzte Kapitel des nationalsozialistischen Massenmords. Reinbek 2011, .
 Andreas Froese-Karow: „Gedenken gestalten.“ Das neue Besucher- und Dokumentationszentrum der Gedenkstätte Feldscheune Isenschnibbe Gardelegen [archive], in: Gedenkstättenrundbrief Nr. 183 (2016), S. 35–43.
 Diana Gring: Das Massaker von Gardelegen. Ansätze zur Spezifizierung von Todesmärschen am Beispiel Gardelegen. In: Detlef Garbe, Carmen Lange (Hrsg.): Häftlinge zwischen Vernichtung und Befreiung. Bremen 2005, S. 155–168.
 Diana Gring: Die Todesmärsche und das Massaker von Gardelegen – NS-Verbrechen in der Endphase des Zweiten Weltkrieges, Gardelegen 1993.
 Diana Gring: "Man kann sich nicht vorstellen, daß die Nacht jemals ein Ende hat": Das Massaker von Gardelegen im April 1945, in: Detlef Garbe, Carmen Lange, Carmen (Hrsg.): Häftlinge zwischen Vernichtung und Befreiung. Die Auflösung des KZ Neuengamme und seiner Außenlager durch die SS im Frühjahr 1945, Bremen 2005, S. 52–56, (PDF;47 kB) [archive].
 Torsten Haarseim: Gardelegen Holocaust (en allemand). Editions winterwork, 2013,.
 Thomas Irmer: Neue Quellen zur Geschichte des Massakers von Gardelegen [archive], in: Gedenkstättenrundbrief 156 (2010), S. 14–19.
 Ulrich Kalmbach, Jürgen M. Pietsch: Zwischen Vergessen und Erinnerung. Stätten des Gedenkens im Altmarkkreis Salzwedel, Delitzsch 2001.
 Landeszentrale für politische Bildung Sachsen-Anhalt (Hg). Verortet. Erinnern und Gedenken in Sachsen-Anhalt. Magdeburg 2004.
 Joachim Neander: Gardelegen 1945. Das Ende der Häftlingstransporte aus dem Konzentrationslager "Mittelbau", Magdeburg 1998.
 Ingolf Seidel: Gedenkstätte Feldscheune Isenschnibbe – Ausbau mit Hindernissen [archive], LaG-Magazin, Sonderausgabe vom 15. März 2017.

External links

 Official Website of Isenschnibbe Barn Memorial Gardelegen
 Gardelegen at the United States Holocaust Memorial Museum
 Memorial at the Stiftung für die ermordeten Juden Europas
 The memorial at the Gardelegen municipality site
 Video made by the DOD with title: "MURDER INC", GARDELEGEN, GERMANY
 Pictures from Gardelegen, April 1945
 Das Massaker von Gardelegen, video by Offener Kanal Magdeburg at Youtube

Notes
This article incorporates text from the United States Holocaust Memorial Museum, and has been released under the GFDL.

Nazi war crimes in Germany
Nazi SS
Conflicts in 1945
1945 in Germany
April 1945 events in Europe
Massacres in 1945
Massacres in Germany
Mass murder in 1945